Never Let Go is a 1960 British thriller film starring Richard Todd, Peter Sellers and Elizabeth Sellars. It concerns a man's attempt to recover his stolen Ford Anglia car. Sellers plays a London villain, in one of his rare serious roles.

Plot
Lionel Meadows is a London garage owner who deals in stolen cars. Meadows buys log books from scrapped models, then has other cars corresponding to the log books stolen and the number plates replaced. He gives a list of cars to young petty thief Tommy Towers, which includes a 1959 Ford Anglia. The car Tommy steals belongs to struggling cosmetics salesman John Cummings, who needs the car to keep his job but who could not afford to insure the car against theft. Desperate to recover it, Cummings learns that he is going to lose his job to a younger colleague.

Alerted to Tommy by a street newspaper vendor, Alfie, who witnessed the crime, Cummings starts investigating the activities of Meadows and his associates. Meadows, disturbed by his inquiries, first brutalises Tommy and then Alfie, who, demeaned and broken, commits suicide.

Meadows discovers Cummings breaking into his garage and has him beaten up, yet Cummings persists in his attempts to recover his car, even after being warned off by police. It emerges that, since his demobilisation from the army, Cummings has failed at several enterprises because of poor judgement and a lack of persistence. At work, he reacts violently to his younger replacement and summarily quits.

Cummings eventually finds the weak link in Meadows's operation: his mistress Jackie, a teenage runaway who was once Tommy's girlfriend but whom Meadows continually threatens and abuses. Cummings takes Jackie under his wing, but Meadows invades Cummings's flat and threatens Jackie and the Cummings family. Though formerly supportive, Mrs. Cummings threatens to take their children and leave her husband if he goes after Meadows.

Jackie goes back to Tommy, whom Meadows has attacked yet again, then calls Cummings to tell him that she and Tommy will give him evidence against Meadows. The police are less interested in recovering Cummings's car than in making a major case against Meadows and his car theft ring. Cummings, who has vowed not to give up, decides to take matters into his own hands, while Meadows is obsessed with keeping the stolen Ford and killing Cummings. He lies in wait for Cummings, who again breaks into the garage. This time Cummings is the winner in a bloody fight, and the police, called by Tommy and Jackie, arrest Meadows. The battered Cummings drives home to find the flat empty, but his wife returns and embraces him.

Cast

Production
The idea for the film began when director John Guillermin had his car stolen. He mentioned it to the producer, Peter de Serigny, and they discussed what would happen if your livelihood was completely dependent on a car that had been stolen. They developed a story outline which they gave to writer Alun Falconer to turn into a script.

Filming began November 1959. Carol White says that during filming she had affairs with Adam Faith, Richard Todd and Peter Sellers. Sellers was reportedly first offered the role of Cummings but asked to play the head criminal. The film was originally called Moment of Truth.

Reception
Critical reception to Never Let Go was mixed. A 1963 review of the film in The New York Times was unfavourable, describing Sellers "grinding his way through the rubble of a drearily routine plot" and attributed his performance in the film, different from his usual comedic roles, to "That itch to play Hamlet, I suppose; a desire to change his pace, which Mr. Sellers has often proclaimed he likes to do".

Critics elsewhere were more impressed with the film. One noted that "John Guillermin's direction is taut and has a degree of flair" whilst another praised the "persuasive" performances of Todd and Sellers. The Australian magazine Filmink also came to much the same conclusion.

Location
The film was shot leavily on location in London.  Much of the action takes place in Chichester Place, Paddington.

DVD
Never Let Go was released to DVD by MGM Home Video on 7 June 2005, as a Region 1 fullscreen DVD.

References

External links

1960 films
1960s crime thriller films
British crime thriller films
Films directed by John Guillermin
Films shot at Pinewood Studios
Films scored by John Barry (composer)
Films set in London
Films shot in London
1960s English-language films
1960s British films